Norman Robinson (18 February 1905 – 27 April 1973) was an Anglican priest. He was educated at Ulverston Grammar School and  Liverpool University and began his working life as a teacher of Mathematics at Quarry Bank School, Liverpool Ordained in 1935, he held curacies at Mossley Hill and Southport before a spell at Lancaster Priory. After incumbencies at Newbarns, Hawcoat, Penrith and West Derby he was appointed  Provost of Blackburn in 1961. He retired in 1972 and died a year later.

Notes

1905 births
People educated at Ulverston Grammar School
Alumni of the University of Liverpool
Provosts and Deans of Blackburn
1973 deaths